Butyrate—CoA ligase, also known as xenobiotic/medium-chain fatty acid-ligase (XM-ligase), is an enzyme that catalyzes the chemical reaction:
ATP + a carboxylic acid + CoA  AMP + diphosphate + an acyl-CoA

The 3 substrates of this enzyme are ATP, carboxylic acid, and CoA, whereas its 3 products are AMP, diphosphate, and acyl-CoA.

This enzyme belongs to the family of ligases, specifically those forming carbon-sulfur bonds as acid-thiol ligases. This enzyme participates in the glycine conjugation of xenobiotics and butanoate metabolism.

Nomenclature 

The systematic name of this enzyme class is butanoate:CoA ligase (AMP-forming). Other names in common use include:
 butyryl-CoA synthetase, fatty acid thiokinase (medium chain),
 acyl-activating enzyme, fatty acid elongate,
 fatty acid activating enzyme,
 fatty acyl coenzyme A synthetase,
 medium chain acyl-CoA synthetase,
 butyryl-coenzyme A synthetase,
 L-(+)-3-hydroxybutyryl CoA ligase, 
 xenobiotic/medium-chain fatty acid ligase, and 
 short-chain acyl-CoA synthetase.

Human proteins containing this domain
ACSM1
ACSM2A
ACSM2B
ACSM3
ACSM4
ACSM5
ACSM6

References

 
 
 

EC 6.2.1
Enzymes of unknown structure